General Andrews may refer to:

Avery D. Andrews (1864–1959), U.S. Army brigadier general
Christopher Columbus Andrews (1829–1922), Union Army brigadier general and brevet major general
Frank Maxwell Andrews (1884–1943), U.S. Army Air Forces lieutenant general
George Andrews (adjutant general) (1850–1928), U.S. Army brigadier general
George Leonard Andrews (1828–1899), Union Army brigadier general
Lincoln Clark Andrews (1867–1950), U.S. Army brigadier general
Timothy Andrews (general) (1794–1868), U.S. Army brevet brigadier general